José Montes de Oca was a Cuban baseball pitcher in the Cuban League. He played with Carmelita in 1908, and Club Fé in 1909.

External links

Year of birth missing
Cuban League players
Cuban baseball players
Club Fé players
Carmelita players
Year of death unknown